Josiah Pugh Wilbarger  (September 10, 1801 – April 11, 1845) was an early Texan who lived for twelve years after being scalped by Comanche Indians.

Early life
He was born in Rockingham County, Virginia, and moved to Kentucky in 1818. Wilbarger moved to Pike County, Missouri, in 1823 and married Margaret Barker in September 1827. They left for Texas soon after the wedding and reached what is now Matagorda County on December 26. Wilbarger was a teacher at Matagorda for a year before moving to La Grange, where he taught and surveyed until he settled in Stephen F. Austin's colony in a bend of the Colorado River, some ten miles above the site of present Bastrop, Texas.

The scalping
In August 1833, Wilbarger was a member of a surveying party of four that was attacked by the Comanche about four miles east of the site of present Austin, Texas. Two of the men were killed and scalped by the Comanches. The other two managed to flee. Wilbarger was scalped and the Comanche left him for dead, but he was still alive when he was found the next day.

References

1801 births
1845 deaths
People from Rockingham County, Virginia
People from Pike County, Missouri
People from Matagorda County, Texas
People from Bastrop County, Texas
American pioneers
American surveyors
Native American history